Šimun is a Croatian male given name, equivalent to Simon. It is also a family name in Croatia and Slovakia.

Given name
 Šimun Kožičić Benja (ca. 1460-1536), Croatian nobleman
 Šimun Katalinić (1889-1977) Croatian rower
 Šimun Milinović (1835-1910) Croatian Roman Catholic priest
 Šimun Debelić (1902-1945) Croatian veterinarian
 Šimun de Michieli-Vitturi, Dalmatian politician

Surname
 Eduard Šimun, Slovakian ice-hockey player
 Nenad Šimun, Croatian rapper known by his stage name Target

See also
 Simun (disambiguation)
 Šime
 Šimunić
 Šimunović

Croatian masculine given names
Slovak-language surnames
Croatian surnames